Paul J. Fouracre is professor emeritus of medieval history at the University of Manchester. His research interests relate to early medieval history, the history of the Franks, law and custom in medieval societies, charters, hagiography and serf-lord relations in the eleventh century.  His recent work on the cost of the liturgy, focusing on the social and economic effects of providing "eternal light", is a study of the interplay between belief and materiality.

Fouracre was co-ordinating editor of Early Medieval Europe from 2005 to 2009 and editor of the first volume of The New Cambridge Medieval History (2005). From 2014 to 2017 he was editor of the Bulletin of the John Rylands Library. He is a Member of the Chetham Society, serving as a Member of Council since 2004 and as President since 2005.

Selected publications
 
The Settlement of Disputes in Early Medieval Europe, Cambridge University Press, Cambridge, 1986.  (Edited with Wendy Davies)
 Property and Power in the Early Middle Ages. Cambridge University Press, Cambridge, 1995.  (Edited with Wendy Davies)
 Late Merovingian France: History and hagiography, 640-720, Manchester University Press, Manchester, 1996.  (translated and edited with Richard A. Gerberding)
 The Age of Charles Martel, Longman, London, 2000.  (Medieval World Series)

References 

Living people
Year of birth missing (living people)
Academic journal editors
Academics of Goldsmiths, University of London
Academics of the University of Manchester
Alumni of the University of London
Alumni of the University of Oxford
British historians
British medievalists
Chetham Society